Bozanti, Idlib or Bazinta  is a Syrian village located in Salqin Nahiyah in Harem District, Idlib.  According to the Syria Central Bureau of Statistics (CBS), Bozanti, Idlib had a population of 98 in the 2004 census.

References 

Populated places in Harem District